The Red Deer River is a river in Alberta and a small portion of Saskatchewan, Canada. It is a major tributary of the South Saskatchewan River and is part of the larger Saskatchewan-Nelson system that empties into Hudson Bay.

The river got its name from the translation of Was-ka-soo seepee which means "elk river" in the Cree language. "Red deer" was an alternative name for elk, referring to a closely related Eurasian species.

Communities located along the Red Deer River include Sundre, Red Deer, Drumheller, and Empress, The city of Brooks, as well as Dinosaur Provincial Park, are also located in the Red Deer River Basin.  A glacial flood about 18,000 years ago eroded out a portion of this basin and apparently all or most of the scenic badlands bearing the dinosaur and other Cretaceous fossils.

History 
Joseph Tyrrell discovered a huge coal seam here in 1883, besides large dinosaur skeletons.

2013 Alberta flood 

In June 2013, Alberta, Canada, experienced heavy rainfall that triggered catastrophic flooding throughout much of the southern half of the province along the Bow, Elbow, Highwood, Oldman, and Red Deer rivers and tributaries. Twenty-four municipalities declared local states of emergency as water levels rose and numerous communities were placed under evacuation orders. The Royal Canadian Mounted Police stated four people may have drowned near High River.  Over 100,000 people have been displaced throughout the region.

Course 

The river originates on the eastern slopes of the Canadian Rockies, in the Sawback Range near the Skoki Valley inside Banff National Park, and then flows east through the mountains and foothills region. It turns north-east before Sundre and flows to an artificial reservoir named Gleniffer Lake, created in 1983 by the Dickson Dam and keeps this heading to the city of Red Deer, where it turns east, and then south before Stettler. It flows south with its valley protected by provincial and regional parks such as  Tolman Badlands Heritage Rangeland, Dry Island Buffalo Jump Provincial Park, Dry Island Corridor and Midland Provincial Park. At Drumheller it has a south-east direction, and while it flows through Dinosaur Provincial Park it turns east and flows to the Alberta/Saskatchewan border, which it crosses at Empress. It flows for  through Saskatchewan before it merges into the South Saskatchewan River.

Tributaries 

Rocky Mountains and Foothills
Red Deer Lakes
Douglas Creek
Douglas Lake, Donald Lake, Gwendolyn Lake
Drummond Creek
Skeleton (Horseshoe) Lake
McConnell Creek
Divide Creek
Pipit Lake
Snowflake Lake
Tyrell Creek
Scalp Creek
Bighorn Creek
Eagle Creek
Wildhorse Creek
Panther River
Dormer River
Wigwam Creek
Yara Creek
McCue Creek
Logan Creek
Bear Creek
Burnt Timber Creek
Bull Creek
Vam Creek
Brown Creek
Williams Creek
Helmer Creek
Cartier Creek
Coalcamp Creek

Central Alberta
Nitchi Creek
Fallentimber Creek
Bearberry Creek
Jackson Creek (Alberta)
James River
Schrader Creek
Eagle Creek
Raven River
North Raven River
Little Red Deer River
Medicine River
Kenning Lake
Sylvan Creek
Piper Creek
Blindman River
Threehills Creek
Kneehills Creek
Rosebud River
Bullpound Creek
Berry Creek
Blood Indian Creek
Ghostpine creek
Pine Lake
Waskasoo Creek
Piper Creek
Alkali Creek

The waters of Ewing Lake, Little Fish Lake also flow into the Red Deer River.

Fish species 
Sport fish include: walleye, northern pike, sauger, lake whitefish,
yellow perch, burbot, lake sturgeon,
mountain whitefish, goldeye, brown trout, bull trout, rainbow trout, brook trout, and cutthroat trout.

Other fish include: emerald shiner, river shiner,
spottail shiner, flathead chub, longnose dace, quillback carpsucker, longnose sucker, 
white sucker, shorthead redhorse, silver redhorse, perch, 
spoonhead sculpine, lake chub,
northern pearl dace, northern redbelly dace, finescale dace, fathead minnow and brook stickleback.

Gallery

Environmental concerns

Pipeline leaks 
The Red Deer River is the water source for the City of Red Deer, Alberta and the surrounding area. Pipelines cross under the river and there have been leaks disrupting access to potable water. Increased water flow of the Red Deer River system during heavy rainfall in June 2008 eroded supporting soil, freely exposing a section of Pembina Pipeline Corporation's Cremona crude oil pipeline to the Red Deer River currents. About 75 to 125 barrels of crude oil flowed upstream from the breakpoint under a Red Deer River channel,  leaving an oily sheen on Gleniffer Reservoir and 6800 kilograms (15 000 lbs) of oil-soaked debris. The remediation was not completed until 2011.

Heavy rains in early June 2012 caused a similar but larger leak on a Plains Midstream Canada 46-year-old pipeline on a Red Deer River tributary, Jackson Creek, Alberta (51°52'19" 114°36'23") near Gleniffer Lake and Dickson Dam, which spilled approximately 1000 and 3000 barrels (160,000-475,000 litres) of light sour crude into the Red Deer River.

See also 
List of crossings of the Red Deer River
List of longest rivers of Canada
List of rivers of Alberta
List of rivers of Saskatchewan
Glacial Lake Bassano

References 

Rivers of Alberta
Rivers of Saskatchewan
South Saskatchewan River
Rivers of the Canadian Rockies
Tributaries of Hudson Bay